Coz Ov Moni 2 (FOKN Revenge) - The World's 2nd 1st Pidgin Musical is a 2013 musical film produced by the FOKN BOIS and directed by independent Ghanaian filmmaker King Luu.

The film is a musical entirely spoken in Ghanaian Pidgin English, but subtitles are shown.

Cast

 M3NSA
 Wanlov the Kubolor
 Yaa Pono
 Efya
 Mutombo Da Poet
 Macho Rapper
 Simpol Tingz
 Sister Deborah
 Pope Skinny
 Bryte
 Awal
 Hogof Theater
 Kwame Appah
 Moskito
 Kwame Partan
 Tilapia

Release
The film premiered in Ghana on 23 December 2013 at Ghana's National Theatre in Accra, premiered in the United States on 21 February 2014 at Cantina Royale in New York City and in the United Kingdom on 24 September 2014 at Hackney Attic in London. The film was also presented at various film festivals, including the Africa International Film Festival (Tinapa), Durban Film Festival (Durban), Norient Musikfilm Festival (Bern) and Fantastic Fest (Austin). It was subsequently released on DVD, with a free download of the Soundtrack for every purchased copy of the movie.

See also 
 Coz Ov Moni (2010), The prequel

References

External links 
 Coz Ov Moni Official website

2013 films
Pidgin English-language films
2010s musical films
Ghanaian musical films
2010s hip hop films